Delavari may refer to:
Delavari, Iran, a village in Kohgiluyeh and Boyer-Ahmad Province, Iran
Jasem Delavari (b. 1986), Iranian boxer